The 28th Massachusetts General Court, consisting of the Massachusetts Senate and the Massachusetts House of Representatives, met in 1807 and 1808 during the governorship of James Sullivan. Samuel Dana served as president of the Senate and Perez Morton served as speaker of the House.

Senators

Representatives

See also
 10th United States Congress
 List of Massachusetts General Courts

References

External links
 . (Includes data for state senate and house elections in 1807)
 
 
 
 

Political history of Massachusetts
Massachusetts legislative sessions
massachusetts
1807 in Massachusetts
massachusetts
1808 in Massachusetts